Jean-Marc Avocat (c. 1948 – 4 October 2020) was a French actor.

Filmography

Cinema
Verdict (1974)
Le Mâle du siècle (1975)
Le Matin du plus beau jour (1979)
Allons z'enfants (1981)
Blanche et Marie (1985)
Paulette, la pauvre petite milliardaire (1986)
Lucky Ravi (1986)
Zone rouge (1986)
Le Dénommé (1990)
La Peur du vide (1999)
Mon père, il m'a sauvé la vie (2001)

Television
La Sourde Oreille (1980)
Simon, la royauté du vent (1980)
La Traque (1980)
Le Rébus (1985)
Le Cri de la chouette (1986)
Cinéma 16 (1986)
Les Enquêtes de Sans Atout (1989)
Un otage de trop (1993)
Les Yeux d'Hélène (1994)
Le Retour d'Arsène Lupin (1995)
L'Histoire du samedi - Les lauriers sont coupés (1997)
Le Refuge (1998)
Le Frère irlandais (1999)
Louis la Brocante (2002)
La Maîtresse du corroyeur (2003)
Vive mon entreprise (2004)
Chat bleu, chat noir (2007)
La Louve (2007)
Kaamelott (2009)
La Maîtresse du président (2009)
Un crime oublié (2012)
Le Sang des Artoux (2012)
Dérapage (2014)
Accusé (2015)

Theatre
Les Misérables at the Théâtre des Célestins

References

1940s births
2020 deaths
French male film actors